Stuartburn Wildlife Management Area is a wildlife management area located  southwest of Vita, Manitoba, Canada. It was established in 1997 under the Manitoba Wildlife Act.

See also
 List of wildlife management areas in Manitoba
 List of protected areas of Manitoba

References

External links
 Stuartburn Wildlife Management Area
 iNaturalist: Stuartburn Wildlife Management Area

Protected areas established in 1997
Wildlife management areas of Manitoba
Protected areas of Manitoba